Gaoyang is a town in and the seat of Gaoyang County, in south-central Hebei province, China, about  southeast of Baoding. , it has 10 residential communities and 13 villages under its administration.

See also
List of township-level divisions of Hebei

References

Gaoyang County
Township-level divisions of Hebei